Aang Hamid Suganda (15 December 1942 – 20 June 2022) was an Indonesian politician. A member of the Indonesian Democratic Party of Struggle, he served as regent of Kuningan from 2003 to 2013.

Suganda died in Jakarta on 20 June 2022 at the age of 79.

References

1942 births
2022 deaths
Mayors and regents of places in West Java
Politicians from West Java
Indonesian Democratic Party of Struggle politicians
People from Kuningan